Fissilicreagris is a genus of pseudoscorpions in family Neobisiidae, first described by Božidar Ćurčić in 1984.

Species 
, the World Pseudoscorpiones Catalog accepts the following four species:
Fissilicreagris chamberlini (Beier, 1931) — US (California)
Fissilicreagris imperialis (Muchmore, 1969) — US (California)
Fissilicreagris macilenta (Simon, 1878) — US (California)
Fissilicreagris sanjosei Ćurčić, Dimitrijević, Makarov & Lučić, 1994 — US (California)

References 

Neobisiidae
Pseudoscorpion genera
Taxonomy articles created by Polbot